Abigail A. Salyers (1942 – 2013) was a microbiologist whose research focused on bacteria in the intestinal tract contributing to better understanding of antibiotic resistance and mobile genetic elements. She was awarded numerous teaching awards, an honorary degree from ETH Zurich and was a past president of the American Society for Microbiology.

Education 
Abigail Salyers was born in Louisville, Kentucky and attended high school in Arlington, Virginia at Wakefield High School. During high school, she was at risk of expulsion due to being pregnant, but she graduated in 1959 and with the help of her English teacher, Mrs. Baker, applied to college. Salyers went on to receive her undergraduate degree in Mathematics in 1963 and a Ph.D. in Nuclear Physics in 1969 from George Washington University, Washington, D.C.

Career 
Four years after starting her first academic position teaching physics at St. Mary's College, she chose to switch her research to microbiology as a post-doctoral researcher at Virginia Polytech Institute. In 1978, Salyers started her own lab at the University of Illinois at Urbana-Champaign. In 1983, she became the first woman professor in the Microbiology Department to be granted tenure, and in 1988 was promoted to full professor. In 2004, she was named the G. William Arends Professor in Molecular and Cellular Biology. While teaching clinical microbiology at Illinois, Salyers updated the curriculum to be more interesting to the students, which entailed co-authoring the textbook Bacterial Pathogenesis: A Molecular Approach with Dixie Whitt.

Salyers studied bacteria which live in the human intestinal tract (Bacteroides) in particular with regard to their ability to harbor mobile antibiotic resistance genes and carbohydrate metabolism.  Her lab discovered conjugative transposons, which can transfer antibiotic resistance genes among gut bacteria. She published over 220 articles. Salyer has also provided her expert testimony regarding genetically modified plants and antibiotic use in agriculture to several regulatory agencies in the U.S. and Europe.

Salyers was Co-Director of the Microbial Diversity Summer Course at the Marine Biological Laboratory in Woods Hole, MA for the summers of 1995–1999. She also was President of the 40,000 member American Society for Microbiology in 2001–2002. Her tenure overlapped with the 2001 anthrax attacks when she advised the US Postal service about the safety precautions. Salyers was also president of the board for El Centro, a center that provided help for local Latino migrant workers in Illinois.

Awards for research and teaching 
 2009 National Graduate Teacher Award in Microbiology.
 Honorary Doctorate from ETH University in Zurich, Switzerland in 2001.
 Pasteur Award for Research and Teaching, the All-Campus Award for Excellence in Teaching and Golden Apple Award (three times) for Medical School Teaching at the University of Illinois.
 An endowed student scholarship for the Microbial Diversity Course was established in her name after her death.
Named the G. William Arends Professor in Molecular and Cellular Biology from 2014 to 2013.

Selected publications

References 

Women microbiologists
1942 births
2013 deaths
Writers from Louisville, Kentucky
George Washington University alumni
University of Illinois faculty
American microbiologists